The following is the qualification system and qualified countries for the Roller sports at the 2023 Pan American Games competition which will be held in Santiago, Chile.

Qualification
A total of 96 roller sports athletes will qualify to compete. 18 will qualify in artistic, 44 in speed skating and 34 in skateboarding. The 2021 Junior Pan American Games and the Pan American Championships for each discipline held in 2022 were used to determine the qualifiers. For skateboarding, the 2023 Olympic World Skateboarding Ranking will be used to determine the qualifiers.

Qualification timeline

Qualification summary

Figure
The top seven countries in each event qualified along with hosts Chile, who were given an automatic entrant into each event. A nation could enter a maximum one skater per event. A total of 18 quotas were available (nine per gender). One extra spot per gender was granted to the winners of the 2021 Junior Pan American Games.

Speed
A total of 44 speed skaters will qualify. Chile as host nation received the maximum quota allocation of four (two men and two women). The remaining 40 spots were allocated using the results of the 2021 Junior Pan American Games, the 2022 Pan American Championship and the 2022 South American Games.

Skateboarding
A total of 34 skateboarders will qualify. Chile as host nation received the maximum quota allocation of four (two men and two women). The remaining 30 spots were allocated using the results of the 2021 Junior Pan American Games and the 2023 World Olympic Rankings.

Park

Street

References

P
Qualification for the 2023 Pan American Games